The Europe Zone was one of the three regional zones of the 1974 Davis Cup.

33 teams entered the Europe Zone, competing across 2 sub-zones. 8 teams entered the competition in the pre-qualifying rounds, with 3 teams progressing to the preliminary rounds to join an additional 21 teams. From these 24 teams, 8 teams progressed to the main draw to join the 4 finalists from the 1973 Europe Zone.

The winners of each sub-zone's main draw went on to compete in the Inter-Zonal Zone against the winners of the Americas Zone and Eastern Zone.

Italy defeated Romania in the Zone A final, and the Soviet Union defeated Czechoslovakia in the Zone B final, resulting in both Italy and the Soviet Union progressing to the Inter-Zonal Zone.

Zone A

Pre-qualifying rounds

Draw

First round
Turkey vs. Lebanon

Qualifying round
Turkey vs. Luxembourg

Preliminary rounds

Draw

First round
Switzerland vs. Austria

Portugal vs. Ireland

Poland vs. Hungary

Finland vs. Turkey

Qualifying round
Austria vs. New Zealand

Portugal vs. France

Sweden vs. Poland

Netherlands vs. Finland

Main Draw

Draw

Quarterfinals
Austria vs. France

Sweden vs. Netherlands

Semifinals
Romania vs. France

Sweden vs. Italy

Final
Italy vs. Romania

Zone B

Pre-qualifying rounds

Draw

First round
Nigeria vs. Morocco

Qualifying round
Egypt vs. Morocco

Iran vs. Israel

Preliminary rounds

Draw

First round
Monaco vs. Denmark

Norway vs. Iran

Egypt vs. Bulgaria

Belgium vs. Greece

Qualifying round
West Germany vs. Denmark

Spain vs. Norway

Egypt vs. Great Britain

Belgium vs. Yugoslavia

Main Draw

Draw

Quarterfinals
West Germany vs. Spain

Egypt vs. Yugoslavia

Semifinals
West Germany vs. Czechoslovakia

Soviet Union vs. Yugoslavia

Final
Soviet Union vs. Czechoslovakia

References

External links
Davis Cup official website

Davis Cup Europe/Africa Zone
Europe Zone
Davis Cup
Davis Cup
Davis Cup
Davis Cup
Davis Cup
Davis Cup
Davis Cup
Davis Cup
1974 in German tennis